Stanley Beach may refer to:
 Stanley, Alexandria, Egypt
 Stanley, Hong Kong